Benito Soliven, officially the Municipality of Benito Soliven,  is a 4th class municipality in the province of Isabela, Philippines. According to the 2020 census, it has a population of 29,752 people.

The town is named after the late Benito Soliven, Congressman of Santo Domingo, Ilocos Sur, during the Commonwealth government.

Geography

Barangays
Benito Soliven is politically subdivided into 29 barangays. These barangays are headed by elected officials: Barangay Captain, Barangay Council, whose members are called Barangay Councilors. All are elected every three years.

Climate

Demographics

Economy

Government

Local government
The municipality is governed by a mayor designated as its local chief executive and by a municipal council as its legislative body in accordance with the Local Government Code. The mayor, vice mayor, and the councilors are elected directly by the people through an election which is being held every three years.

Elected officials

{| class="wikitable" style="line-height:1.20em; font-size:100%;"
|+ Members of the Municipal Council(2019–2022)
|-
! Position
! Name
|-
| Congressman
| style="text-align:center;" | Ed Christopher S. Go
|-
| Mayor
| style="text-align:center;" | Roberto T. Lungan
|-
|Vice-Mayor
| style="text-align:center;" | John Paul S. Azur
|-
|rowspan=8| Councilors
| style="text-align:center;" | Rose Jane S. Azur
|-
| style="text-align:center;" | Roxan V. Lungan
|-
| style="text-align:center;" | Ernie John B. Abu
|-
| style="text-align:center;" | Mary Joseph G. Carreon
|-
| style="text-align:center;" | Amado G. Viernes
|-
| style="text-align:center;" | Marshal Ancheta
|-
| style="text-align:center;" | Rommel L. Rinion
|-
| style="text-align:center;" | Ferdinand Dela Cruz

Congress representation
Benito Soliven, belonging to the second legislative district of the province of Isabela, currently represented by Hon. Ed Christopher S. Go.

Education
The Schools Division of Isabela governs the town's public education system. The division office is a field office of the DepEd in Cagayan Valley region. The office governs the public and private elementary and public and private high schools throughout the municipality.

References

External links
Municipal Profile at the National Competitiveness Council of the Philippines
Benito Soliven at the Isabela Government Website
Local Governance Performance Management System
[ Philippine Standard Geographic Code]
Philippine Census Information
Municipality of Benito Soliven

Municipalities of Isabela (province)